Navy News is the newspaper published by the Royal Australian Navy. The paper is produced fortnightly and is uploaded online so that members can access it when deployed overseas. The first edition was published in July 1958.

See also
Army (newspaper)
Air Force (newspaper)

References

External links 
Official Site

Biweekly magazines published in Australia
Royal Australian Navy
Military newspapers published in Australia
1958 establishments in Australia